"Nie genug" is a song by Austrian recording artist Christina Stürmer. It was written by Thorsten Brötzmann, Alex Geringas, and Ivo Mohring for her third album, Lebe lauter (2006), while production was overseen by the former.

Music video 
The music video starts off with Stürmer singing live with her band on the beach of a lake. Shots of her walking down a road, with a truck following behind her are shown. Scenes of Stürmer singing on rocks by the lake are shown. As the chorus starts for the second time, Stürmer begins running down the road, and the truck continues to follow her. By the end of the video, Stürmer stops running, and the rest of the band who are in the truck pull her onto it. The truck was rented by Event Film Cars Spain, the largest picture vehicle provider in Spain.

Charts

Weekly charts

Year-end charts

References

External links
 
 Film Car website

2006 singles
Christina Stürmer songs
Number-one singles in Austria
Songs written by Thorsten Brötzmann
Songs written by Alexander Geringas
Songs written by Ivo Moring